The 1924 Indiana Hoosiers football team represented the Indiana Hoosiers in the 1924 Big Ten Conference football season as members of the Big Ten Conference. The Hoosiers played their home games at Jordan Field in Bloomington, Indiana. The team was coached by Bill Ingram, in his second year as head coach.

Schedule

References

Indiana
Indiana Hoosiers football seasons
Indiana Hoosiers football